Loki's Castle is a field of five active hydrothermal vents in the mid-Atlantic Ocean, located at 73 degrees north on the Mid-Atlantic Ridge between Greenland and Norway at a depth of . The vents were discovered in mid-July 2008 and are the most northerly black smokers to date. They are of geological interest as they occur in a relatively stable region of the Earth's crust, one with diminished tectonic forces and consequently fewer hydrothermal vents.

Discovery
The 2005 and 2008 expeditions were both led by geologist Rolf Pedersen of the university's Centre for Geobiology, aboard the research vessel G.O. Sars (named after the Norwegian marine biologist Georg Ossian Sars and launched in May 2003). The vents were located using a remotely controlled undersea vehicle.

Activity
The five active chimneys of Loki's Castle are venting water as hot as 300 °C (570 °F) and sit on a vast mound of sulfide minerals which is about 825 ft (250 m) in diameter at its base, and some 300 feet (90 m) across its top. A member of the 2008 expedition, oceanographer Marvin Lilley has speculated that this may be the largest such deposit ever seen on the sea floor. The active chimneys are mostly black in colour, but are covered with mats of white bacteria which are living on minerals and materials emitted by the vents. The older chimneys are a mottled red colour, due to the presence of deposits of oxidised iron.

Preliminary observations have shown the warm area around the Loki's Castle vents to be alive with diverse and apparently unique microorganisms and vent fauna, unlike vent communities observed elsewhere. One of these is the archaeal phylum Lokiarchaeota, which is named after Loki's Castle.

The vent field was given the name Loki's Castle as its shape reminded its discoverers of a fantasy castle. The reference is to the ancient Norse god of trickery, Loki. It was felt to be "an appropriate name for a field that was so difficult to locate".

See also
Asgard (archaea)
Lokiarchaeota

References

External links
Sandra Hines, Scientists break record by finding northernmost hydrothermal vent field, University of Washington Press Release, 24 July 2008.
2008 University of Bergen Expedition Journal for Day 17 (15 July 2008), describing the moment of discovery.
Photographs of the 2008 University of Bergen Expedition team members
Background information about hydrothermal fields (provided by the Centre for Geobiology, University of Bergen)
Loki's Castle, InterRidge Vents Database

Hydrothermal vents
Volcanoes of the Atlantic Ocean